Glen Berry (born 21 April 1978) is a retired British actor.

Early life
Berry started attending the Anna Scher Theatre School in London in 1993, and his first steps in show business included a part as a skinhead in an ad for voluntary service.

Career
Starting in 1995 he had a recurring role on the soap opera London Bridge. He got his big break playing Jamie in the 1996 gay coming-of-age film Beautiful Thing alongside another Anna Scher Theatre School pupil, Scott Neal. Further acting credits include several BBC TV films, such as Blood and Fire and Between the Lines.

Other roles have included a cameo in ITV's The Bill TV series, (again with Scott Neal) and a role as an office junior in the BBC legal drama Trust in 2003.

Berry retired from acting in 2003. As of 2008, he works as a car sales manager in Chelmsford, Essex.

Selected filmography

References

External links
 

English male television actors
Alumni of the Anna Scher Theatre School
1978 births
Living people
People from Romford
Male actors from London